Carl Hjalmar Borgstrøm (1909 – 1986) was a Norwegian professor of Indo-European linguistics who made significant contributions to the scientific study of Scottish Gaelic and Irish.

His key publications on Scottish Gaelic include:
 (1937) The dialect of Barra in the Outer Hebrides Norsk Tidsskrift for Sprogvidenskap 8
 (1940) A linguistic survey of the Gaelic dialects of Scotland. The dialects of the Outer Hebrides Oslo University Press
 (1941) A linguistic survey of the Gaelic dialects of Scotland. The dialects of Skye and Ross-shire Oslo University Press

References

1909 births
1986 deaths
Linguists from Norway
Scottish Gaelic language
20th-century linguists